The men's javelin throw at the 2007 All-Africa Games was held on July 22.

Results

References
Results

Javelin